Flattop Peak is a  summit in British Columbia, Canada.

Description
Flattop is located in The Bugaboos, west of the Bugaboo Glacier along the southern boundary of Bugaboo Provincial Park. Precipitation runoff from Flattop Peak drains east into Bugaboo Creek which is a tributary of the Columbia River; as well as west to Duncan River via East Creek. The nearest higher neighbor is line parent Howser Peak,  to the southeast.

History
The peak's descriptive name was applied by Eaton Cromwell, who made the first ascent of the summit with Peter Kaufmann on August 10, 1930. The mountain's toponym was officially adopted on June 9, 1960, by the Geographical Names Board of Canada.

Climate

Based on the Köppen climate classification, Flattop Peak is located in a subarctic climate zone with cold, snowy winters, and mild summers. Winter temperatures can drop below −20 °C with wind chill factors below −30 °C. This climate supports the Bugaboo Glacier on the peak's east slope and an unnamed glacier on the south slope.

See also
 The Bugaboos
 Geography of British Columbia

References

External links
 Flattop Peak: weather

Columbia Valley
Three-thousanders of British Columbia
Purcell Mountains
Kootenay Land District